Conchiglie, commonly known as "shells" or "seashells", is a type of pasta. It is usually sold in the plain durum wheat variety, and also in colored varieties which use natural pigments, such as tomato extract, squid ink or spinach extract. The shell shape of the pasta allows the sauce to adhere to it. A miniature variety called conchigliette is also available.

Etymology
The name derives from the Italian word for seashell (conchiglia). The Italian word conchiglie and the English word "conch" share the same Greek root in the form of κοχύλι (kochýli), which means "shell".

Other names
In the 1930s, fascism celebrated the Italian colonial empire with new pasta shapes recalling the African lands: tripoline (Tripoli), bengasine (Bengasi), assabesi (Assab), and abissine (Abissinia). In 2021, after an outcry in objection to pasta brand La Molisana's advertising campaign, abissine were renamed as conchiglie (shells). However, some complained, claiming this re-naming constituted cancel culture.

References

See also

List of pasta

Types of pasta